"Äntligen" is a pop rock song by Swedish singer-songwriter Marie Fredriksson, released on 20 March 2000 by EMI as the lead single from her first greatest hits compilation album, Äntligen – Marie Fredrikssons bästa 1984–2000. The track was written and produced by Fredriksson alongside her husband Mikael Bolyos, and recorded at the couple's home studio in Djursholm. The song was a minor hit in her home country upon release, peaking at number 34 and spending eight weeks on the Swedish Singles Chart. A remixed version of the song, titled "Solen gick ner över stan" ("The Sun Went Down over the City"), appeared as the b-side; an edited version of this remix also appeared as a bonus track on the parent compilation.

Track listing
 CD single 
 "Äntligen"  – 4:02
 "Solen gick ner över stan"  – 5:13

 Promotional CD 
 "Äntligen"  – 3:33
 "Solen gick ner över stan"  – 3:33

Credits and personnel
Credits adapted from the liner notes of the CD single.

Musicians
 Marie Fredriksson – lead and background vocals and production
 Mikael Bolyos – keyboards, programming, musical arrangement, engineering, production and mixing
 Ove Andersson – bass guitar
 Anders Garstedt – trumpet and flugelhorn
 Karin Hammar – trombone
 Christer Jansson – drums and percussion
 Magnus Lindgren – arrangement, tenor and baritone saxophones 
 Mattias Torell – acoustic and electric guitars

Technical
 Kjell Andersson – sleeve design
 Mattias Edwall – photography
 Roger Krieg – mixing
 Pär Wickholm – sleeve design

Charts

References

External links

2000 singles
2000 songs
Marie Fredriksson songs
Swedish pop songs
Swedish-language songs
EMI Records singles
Songs written by Marie Fredriksson